A headscarf is a scarf covering most or all of the top of a person's, usually women's, hair and head, leaving the face uncovered. A headscarf is formed of a triangular cloth or a square cloth folded into a triangle, with which the head is covered.

Purposes

Headscarves may be worn for a variety of purposes, such as protection of the head or hair from rain, wind, dirt, cold, warmth, for sanitation, for fashion, recognition or social distinction; with religious significance, to hide baldness, out of modesty, or other forms of social convention. Headscarves are now mainly worn for practical, cultural or religious reasons.

Until the latter 20th century, headscarves were commonly worn by women in many parts of Europe, Southwestern Asia, North Africa, and the Americas, as well as some other parts of the world. In recent decades, headscarves, like hats, have fallen out of favor in Western culture. They are still, though, common in many rural areas of Eastern Europe as well as many areas of the Middle East and the Indian subcontinent.

Among Anabaptist Christians, this often takes the form of a Kapp or hanging veil—being worn throughout the day. For Eastern Orthodox Christians, headscarves are traditionally worn by women while attending the church, and historically, in the public too though in certain localities, this has waned.

A form of headscarf, known as the hijab, is often seen in Muslim countries and is born out of tradition. It is worn by some Muslim women who consider it to be a religious ordainment, and its style varies by culture. Not all Muslims believe that the hijab in the context of head covering is a religious ordainment in the Quran.

For Fashion and ceremonial usage, the Gele is a traditional headscarf of Yoruba Women for  fashionable purposes.

Religious use
Headscarves may specifically have a religious significance or function, or be expected as a matter of social custom, the two very often being confused.

Judaism
Judaism, under Halakhah (Jewish Law), promotes modest dress among women and men. Many married Orthodox Jewish women wear a headscarf (mitpahat or tichel), snood, turban, or shpitzel to cover their hair. The Tallit is commonly worn by Jewish men, especially for prayers, which they use to cover their heads in order to recite the blessings, although not all men do this. It also may not apply to the entire prayer service, sometimes only specific sections such as the Amidah. The Kohanim (priests) also cover their heads and shoulders with the tallit during the priestly blessing, so as to conform to Halakah which states that the hands of the priests should not be seen during this time as their mystical significance to the hand position.

Christianity

Christian head covering with an opaque cloth veil was the practice of the early Church, being universally taught by the Church Fathers and practiced by Christian women throughout history since then, continuing to be the ordinary practice among Christians in many parts of the world, such as Romania, Russia, Ukraine, Ethiopia, India, Pakistan, and South Korea. The Early Church Father John Chrysostom (407) delineated Saint Paul's teaching, explaining that Christian women should wear a cloth head covering all the time in view of Saint Paul's comparison of a woman not wearing a veil to being shaven, which he states is "always dishonourable": 

The Church Fathers taught that because the hair of a woman has sexual potency, it should only be for her husband to see and covered the rest of the time. To some extent, the covering of the head depended on where the woman was, but it was usual outside and on formal occasions, especially when praying at home and worshipping in church. Certain styles of Christian head coverings were an indication of married status; the "matron's cap" is a general term for these. 

Many Anabaptist Christian women (Amish/Para-Amish, Schwarzenau Brethren, Bruderhof, Hutterites, River Brethren, Apostolic Christians, Charity Christians and Mennonites) wear their headscarf at all times, except when sleeping; these head coverings are usually in the form of a hanging veil or kapp.

In countries with large Eastern Orthodox Christian population such as Romania or Russia headscarves and veils are used by Christian women in the Eastern Orthodox Church, Oriental Orthodox Church, Assyrian Church of the East, and Roman Catholic Church. A few years back, all women in Russia who attended Divine Liturgy wore head-coverings. A woman having her head covered means that she honors the Lord. Head-coverings also symbolizes that a woman is married and that her husband is the head of the family. Little girls also have their heads covered when they go to Mass at church, not because they are married, but in order to honor the Lord. Today, young Russian Orthodox women and little girls still cover their heads when going to church, although it differs in style from those worn by women of older age (grandmothers).

The Roman Catholic Church required all women to wear a Christian headcovering over their hair in church until the 1980s; in Spain, these take the form of the mantilla. Women meeting the Pope in formal audiences are still expected to wear them. Martin Luther, the German Reformer, as well as John Calvin, a major figure in the Reformed Churches, also expected women to cover their heads in church, as did John Wesley, the founder of the Methodist Churches.

In many rural areas, women, especially widows, continue to observe the traditional Christian custom of headcovering, especially in the Mediterranean, as well as in eastern and southern Europe; in South Asia, it is common for Christian women to wear a headcovering called a dupatta. At times the styles of covering using simple cloth became very elaborate, with complicated layers and folding, held in place with hair pins.  Among the many terms for head-coverings made of flexible cloth are wimple, hennin, kerchief, gable hood, as well as light hats, mob caps and bonnets.

Some English speakers use the word "babushka" (the word for "grandma" in ) to indicate a headscarf tied below the chin, as still commonly worn in rural parts of Europe. In many parts of Europe, headscarves are used mainly by elderly women, and this led to the use of the term "babushka", an East Slavic word meaning "grandmother". Some types of head coverings that Russian women wear are: circlet, veil, and wimple.

Islam
 

Islam promotes modest dress among men and women.  According to some, it is the “khimar” mentioned in the Quran. Many of these garments cover the hair, ears and throat, but do not cover the face. Not all Muslims believe that the hijab in the context of headcovering is a religious ordainment in the Quran. 

The Keffiyeh is commonly used by Muslim men, as for example Yasser Arafat who adopted a black and white fishnet-patterned keffiyeh as a hallmark.

Headscarves and veils are used by some Muslim women and girls, so that no one has the right to expose her beauty but except her husband, father, son, brother, uncles, grandfather. The Muslim religious dress varies, and various cultures include burqa, chador, niqab, dupatta, or other types of hijab, while others reject all of these dress codes. The religion prescribes modest behaviour or dress in general.

A survey from the University of Michigan’s Institute for Social Research conducted in seven Muslim-majority countries (Tunisia, Egypt, Iraq, Lebanon, Pakistan, Saudi Arabia and Turkey), finds that most people prefer that a woman completely cover her hair, but not necessarily her face. Only in Turkey and Lebanon do more than one-in-four think it is appropriate for a woman to not cover her head at all in public. Most respondents say woman whose hair and ears are completely covered by a hijab, is the most appropriately dressed for public. This includes 57% in Tunisia, 52% in Egypt, 46% in Turkey and 44% in Iraq. In Iraq and Egypt, woman , whose hair and ears are covered by a more conservative black hijab, is the second most popular choice.

Sikhism
Young Sikhs often wear a cloth wrapping to cover their hair, before moving on to the turban. Older Sikhs may wear them as an under-turban.

Use while working
 

Practical reasons for headscarf use at work include protection from bad weather and protection against industrial contamination, for example in dusty and oily environments. A headscarf can ensure that the hair does not interfere with the work and get caught-up in machinery since long hair can get into rotating parts of machines, so this is avoided either by means of a suitable head covering like a cap, hairnet or kerchief; cutting the hair short; or by putting on a headscarf.  Hygiene also requires wearing a head cover at some workplaces, for example in kitchens and hospitals. Such usage has gone on since about 1900, when women's use of mob caps and Dutch bonnets declined.

Workers wore them at work to protect their hair from dirt. Farmers used them to see off the weather and dirt. Soviet labour units of the 1930s and 1940s wore them as part of their uniform (where uniforms were available). This habit was common until about the 1950s in the West for farmers and 1960s factory workers, and 1970s in the former USSR for farmers and factory workers.

In popular culture

In the modern era, persons may choose to wear a headscarf for religious, moral, or practical reasons.

Hilda Ogden, popular character from the UK soap opera Coronation Street portrayed by Jean Alexander, became famous throughout the nation for combining a headscarf with hair curlers. So famous was she that, in 1982, she came fourth behind the Queen Mother, Queen Elizabeth II, and Diana, Princess of Wales in a poll of the most recognisable women in Britain.

Image gallery

See also 

 Bandana
 Christian headcovering
 Head tie
 Headscarf controversy in Turkey
 Islamic dress in Europe
Mathabana
 Shalwar Kameez
 Tichel
 Turban
 Veil

References

Further reading

External links 
 

African clothing
Headgear
Islamic female clothing
Jewish religious clothing
Scarves